Surprise City is a ghost town located in the Atlin Country Region of British Columbia. Surprise City is located on Otter Creek near the southwest end of Surprise Lake.  Surprise City is also known as Otter Creek. The city existed to support the gold mining operations in the area.

References

Ghost towns in British Columbia